Auline Bates is an American author who writes for young adults and adults. Her teen suspense novels, written as A. Bates, include Party Line, Final Exam, Mother's Helper, The Dead Game and Krazy 4 U.

The Wall Street Journal references Final Exam in an article about "wildly popular spooky tales and murder mysteries tailored for teenagers" in an article entitled "Gnarlatious Novels: Lurid Thrillers for the Teen Set". The Oregonian refers to Final Exam as one of four "new paperback hit thrillers", and Westword gives a paragraph to her book signing for Party Line and Final Exam.

Publications

Teen Suspense
 Party Line (1989)
 Final Exam (1990)
 Mother's Helper (1991)
 Cross the Line (1992)
 The Dead Game (1993)
 Krazy 4 U (1996)
 See Kerry Run
 Lost and Found
 Speed Trap

Middle Grade
 Without Uncle Joe
 A Certain Spot in the Woods
 Best Friends Forever
 Mr. Jones's Bones
 Gathering Indio
 Belle in the Shadows (2012)
 Bad Alphonso (2012)
 The Waiting Room (2013)

Adult Fiction
 Angel of Mercy
 On Angel Wings

Anthologies
 Thirteen: 13 Tales of Horror by 13 Masters of Horror – ed. T. Pines; contains Bates's short story Deathflash(1991)

References

External links
 

Living people
American children's writers
Year of birth missing (living people)